is a former Japanese football player. His elder brother Keiji is also a former footballer.

Early years
Kaimoto was born in Suita on October 14, 1977.

Club career
He joined his local club, Gamba Osaka, in 1996. He played as a midfielder during the first season. Although he played often at first, he did not play at all in 1999 due to injuries. In 2001, he moved to the South Korean team Seongnam Ilhwa Chunma. The club won the championship two years in a row (2001-2002). In 2003, he returned to Japan and joined Nagoya Grampus Eight. His brother Keiji also played for the club. He played often as a right-side midfielder over two seasons. In 2005, he moved to the Albirex Niigata with Keiji. However he did not play as often. In June 2006, he moved to the J2 League club Tokyo Verdy. He played often as a right-side back and right midfielder. The club was promoted to the J1 League in 2008. However, he did not play much in 2008. Toward the end of his career, he played for the Australian clubs Bonnyrigg White Eagles and North Queensland Fury in 2009. He retired in October 2009.

Career statistics

Club

References

External links

1977 births
Living people
Association football people from Osaka Prefecture
People from Suita
Japanese footballers
J1 League players
J2 League players
A-League Men players
Gamba Osaka players
Seongnam FC players
Nagoya Grampus players
Albirex Niigata players
Tokyo Verdy players
Bonnyrigg White Eagles FC players
Northern Fury FC players
Japanese expatriate footballers
Expatriate footballers in South Korea
Japanese expatriate sportspeople in South Korea
Expatriate soccer players in Australia
Association football defenders